Acrolophitus hirtipes, known generally as the green fool grasshopper or plains point-head grasshopper, is a species of slant-faced grasshopper in the family Acrididae. It is found in Central America and North America.

References

Further reading

External links

 

Gomphocerinae
Articles created by Qbugbot
Insects described in 1825
Orthoptera of North America